ENSHAA PSC is a developer of projects and a hospitality service provider based in the United Arab Emirates. Their CEO is Raza Jafar.

ENSHAA currently operates in the GCC region while also expanding into international markets. The firm's major shareholders include Emirates Investments Group, Majid Al Futtaim Group and Abraaj Capital.

Portfolio

ENSHAA's real estate portfolio includes  
Palazzo Versace Dubai
D1 Tower and Emirates Financial Towers.

References

External links

Property companies of the United Arab Emirates
Hospitality companies of the United Arab Emirates